Spearsville is a village in Union Parish, Louisiana, United States. The population was 137 at the 2010 census, a decrease from 155 in 2000. It is part of the Monroe Metropolitan Statistical Area.

Geography
Spearsville is located at  (32.934637, -92.604776).

According to the United States Census Bureau, the village has a total area of 2.1 square miles (5.3 km), all land.

Demographics

As of the census of 2000, there were 155 people, 71 households, and 42 families residing in the village. The racial makeup of the village was 96.77% White, 3.23% from other races. Hispanic or Latino of any race were 3.23% of the population.

There were 71 households, out of which 23.9% had children under the age of 18 living with them, 54.9% were married couples living together, 1.4% had a female householder with no husband present, and 40.8% were non-families. 39.4% of all households were made up of individuals, and 29.6% had someone living alone who was 65 years of age or older. The average household size was 2.18 and the average family size was 2.95.

In the village, the population was spread out, with 23.9% under the age of 18, 7.7% from 18 to 24, 18.1% from 25 to 44, 22.6% from 45 to 64, and 27.7% who were 65 years of age or older. The median age was 46 years. For every 100 females, there were 86.7 males. For every 100 females age 18 and over, there were 84.4 males.

The median income for a household in the village was $26,250, and the median income for a family was $36,719. Males had a median income of $38,125 versus $16,667 for females. The per capita income for the village was $13,542. About 23.4% of families and 23.3% of the population were below the poverty line, including 12.5% of those under the age of eighteen and 32.0% of those 65 or over.

Education
Residents are assigned to Union Parish Public Schools.

References

External links
 Spearsville Progress Community Progress Site for Spearsville

Villages in Louisiana
Villages in Union Parish, Louisiana
Villages in Monroe, Louisiana metropolitan area